Authentication, in the law of evidence, is the process by which documentary evidence and other physical evidence is proven to be genuine, and not a forgery. Generally, authentication can be shown in one of two ways. First, a witness can testify as to the chain of custody through which the evidence passed from the time of the discovery up until the trial. Second, the evidence can be authenticated by the opinion of an expert witness examining the evidence to determine if it has all of the properties that it would be expected to have if it were authentic.

For handwritten documents, any person who has become familiar with the purported author's handwriting prior to the cause of action from which the trial arose can testify that a document is in that handwriting.

There are several kinds of documents which have generally been deemed to be self-authenticating documents. These include commercial labels, newspapers and other periodicals, and official publications of an arm of the government.

A special category of evidence called an ancient document will be deemed authentic if it can be shown to be more than twenty years old, and found in a place and condition that a document of that age would likely be found.

Evidence law